A deuterated drug is a small molecule medicinal product in which one or more of the hydrogen atoms contained in the drug molecule have been replaced by its heavier stable isotope deuterium. Because of the kinetic isotope effect, deuterium-containing drugs may have significantly lower rates of metabolism, and hence a longer half-life.

Mode of action
Hydrogen is a chemical element with an atomic number of 1. It has just one proton and one electron. Deuterium is the heavier naturally occurring, non-radioactive, stable isotope of hydrogen. Deuterium was discovered by Harold Urey in 1931, for which he received the Nobel Prize in 1934. The deuterium isotope effect has become an important tool in the  elucidation of the mechanism of chemical reactions. Deuterium contains one proton, one electron, and a neutron, effectively doubling the mass of the deuterium isotope without changing its properties significantly. However, the C–D bond is a bit shorter, and it has reduced electronic polarizability and less hyperconjugative stabilization of adjacent bonds, including developing an anti-bonding orbital as part of the newly formed bond. This can potentially result in weaker van der Waals stabilization, and  can produce other changes in properties that are difficult to predict, including changes in the intramolecular volume and the transition state volume. Substituting deuterium for hydrogen yields deuterated compounds that are similar in size and shape to hydrogen-based compounds.

History
The concept of replacing hydrogen with deuterium is an example of bioisosterism, whereby similar biological effects to a known drug are produced in an analog designed to confer superior properties. The first patent in the US granted for deuterated molecules was in the 1970s. Since then patents on deuterated drugs have become more common.

The applications of the deuterium isotope effect has increased over time, and it is now applied extensively in mechanistic studies of the metabolism of drugs as well as other studies focused on pharmacokinetics (PK), efficacy, tolerability, bioavailability, and safety. The introduction of deuterated drug candidates that began in the 1970s evolved from earlier work with deuterated metabolites. However, it took more than 40 years for the first deuterated drug, deutetrabenazine, to be approved by the FDA. Numerous publications have discussed the advantages and disadvantages of deuterated drugs
A number of publications have discussed aspects of intellectual property of deuterated versions of drugs.

Examples 

Deutetrabenazine is a deuterated version of tetrabenazine. It was developed by Teva and approved by the FDA in 2017 as a treatment for chorea associated with Huntington's disease; it has a longer half life than the non-deuterated form of tetrabenazine, which had been approved earlier for the same use.

Deucravacitinib is a deuterated JAK inhibitor (specifically, TYK2 inhibitor) approved for the treatment of plaque psoriasis.

Concert Pharmaceuticals focuses on deuterated drugs for various conditions.

The company Retrotope discovered and has been developing a deuterated fatty acid RT001 as a treatment for neurodegenerative diseases such as Friedreich's ataxia and infantile neuroaxonal dystrophy. Their premise is that fatty acids in cell membranes are a source of reactive oxygen species and deuterated versions will be less prone to generating them.

References

Further reading 
Heavy drugs gaining momentum. 

Deuterated compounds
Drugs
Chemicals in medicine